The Kanash constituency (No.37) is a Russian legislative constituency in the Chuvashia. Until 2007 the constituency covered upstate Chuvashia to the south of Cheboksary, however, since 2016 the constituency occupies eastern Chuvashia, including Novocheboksarsk and parts of Cheboksary.

Members elected

Election results

1993

|-
! colspan=2 style="background-color:#E9E9E9;text-align:left;vertical-align:top;" |Candidate
! style="background-color:#E9E9E9;text-align:left;vertical-align:top;" |Party
! style="background-color:#E9E9E9;text-align:right;" |Votes
! style="background-color:#E9E9E9;text-align:right;" |%
|-
|style="background-color:"|
|align=left|Valentin Agafonov
|align=left|Independent
|
|41.01%
|-
|style="background-color:"|
|align=left|Vyacheslav Tikhonov
|align=left|Independent
| -
|10.30%
|-
| colspan="5" style="background-color:#E9E9E9;"|
|- style="font-weight:bold"
| colspan="3" style="text-align:left;" | Total
| 
| 100%
|-
| colspan="5" style="background-color:#E9E9E9;"|
|- style="font-weight:bold"
| colspan="4" |Source:
|
|}

1995

|-
! colspan=2 style="background-color:#E9E9E9;text-align:left;vertical-align:top;" |Candidate
! style="background-color:#E9E9E9;text-align:left;vertical-align:top;" |Party
! style="background-color:#E9E9E9;text-align:right;" |Votes
! style="background-color:#E9E9E9;text-align:right;" |%
|-
|style="background-color:"|
|align=left|Valentin Agafonov (incumbent)
|align=left|Independent
|
|40.19%
|-
|style="background-color:"|
|align=left|Lev Kurakov
|align=left|Independent
|
|31.76%
|-
|style="background-color:"|
|align=left|Gennady Kuzmin
|align=left|Liberal Democratic Party
|
|5.90%
|-
|style="background-color:"|
|align=left|Lyudmila Rulkova
|align=left|Our Home – Russia
|
|5.23%
|-
|style="background-color:#F7C451"|
|align=left|Svetlana Lyapidovskaya
|align=left|Common Cause
|
|4.12%
|-
|style="background-color:#2C299A"|
|align=left|Vladimir Barsukov
|align=left|Congress of Russian Communities
|
|1.82%
|-
|style="background-color:#000000"|
|colspan=2 |against all
|
|6.41%
|-
| colspan="5" style="background-color:#E9E9E9;"|
|- style="font-weight:bold"
| colspan="3" style="text-align:left;" | Total
| 
| 100%
|-
| colspan="5" style="background-color:#E9E9E9;"|
|- style="font-weight:bold"
| colspan="4" |Source:
|
|}

1999

|-
! colspan=2 style="background-color:#E9E9E9;text-align:left;vertical-align:top;" |Candidate
! style="background-color:#E9E9E9;text-align:left;vertical-align:top;" |Party
! style="background-color:#E9E9E9;text-align:right;" |Votes
! style="background-color:#E9E9E9;text-align:right;" |%
|-
|style="background-color:"|
|align=left|Valentin Shurchanov
|align=left|Communist Party
|
|40.26%
|-
|style="background-color:"|
|align=left|Pyotr Ivantayev
|align=left|Independent
|
|35.57%
|-
|style="background-color:"|
|align=left|Vladimir Mayorov
|align=left|Independent
|
|6.96%
|-
|style="background-color:"|
|align=left|Vladimir Mukin
|align=left|Yabloko
|
|3.62%
|-
|style="background-color:"|
|align=left|Valentin Agafonov (incumbent)
|align=left|Independent
|
|2.60%
|-
|style="background-color:#E2CA66"|
|align=left|Anatoly Zhuromsky
|align=left|For Civil Dignity
|
|2.49%
|-
|style="background-color:#000000"|
|colspan=2 |against all
|
|4.65%
|-
| colspan="5" style="background-color:#E9E9E9;"|
|- style="font-weight:bold"
| colspan="3" style="text-align:left;" | Total
| 
| 100%
|-
| colspan="5" style="background-color:#E9E9E9;"|
|- style="font-weight:bold"
| colspan="4" |Source:
|
|}

2003

|-
! colspan=2 style="background-color:#E9E9E9;text-align:left;vertical-align:top;" |Candidate
! style="background-color:#E9E9E9;text-align:left;vertical-align:top;" |Party
! style="background-color:#E9E9E9;text-align:right;" |Votes
! style="background-color:#E9E9E9;text-align:right;" |%
|-
|style="background-color:"|
|align=left|Pavel Semyonov
|align=left|United Russia
|
|70.55%
|-
|style="background-color:"|
|align=left|Valentin Shurchanov (incumbent)
|align=left|Communist Party
|
|19.91%
|-
|style="background-color:"|
|align=left|Vladimir Izhederov
|align=left|Independent
|
|1.06%
|-
|style="background-color:"|
|align=left|Nikolay Vladimirov
|align=left|Yabloko
|
|0.99%
|-
|style="background-color:#7C73CC"|
|align=left|Konstantin Ilyin
|align=left|Great Russia – Eurasian Union
|
|0.67%
|-
|style="background-color:#164C8C"|
|align=left|Robert Churkin
|align=left|United Russian Party Rus'
|
|0.54%
|-
|style="background-color:#000000"|
|colspan=2 |against all
|
|3.39%
|-
| colspan="5" style="background-color:#E9E9E9;"|
|- style="font-weight:bold"
| colspan="3" style="text-align:left;" | Total
| 
| 100%
|-
| colspan="5" style="background-color:#E9E9E9;"|
|- style="font-weight:bold"
| colspan="4" |Source:
|
|}

2016

|-
! colspan=2 style="background-color:#E9E9E9;text-align:left;vertical-align:top;" |Candidate
! style="background-color:#E9E9E9;text-align:leftt;vertical-align:top;" |Party
! style="background-color:#E9E9E9;text-align:right;" |Votes
! style="background-color:#E9E9E9;text-align:right;" |%
|-
|style="background-color:"|
|align=left|Anatoly Aksakov
|align=left|A Just Russia
|
|29.99%
|-
|style="background:"| 
|align=left|Aleksandr Kapitonov
|align=left|Party of Growth
|
|21.39%
|-
|style="background-color:"|
|align=left|Grigory Danilov
|align=left|Communist Party
|
|13.63%
|-
|style="background-color:"|
|align=left|Konstantin Stepanov
|align=left|Liberal Democratic Party
|
|8.66%
|-
|style="background-color:"|
|align=left|Vladimir Mikhaylov
|align=left|Rodina
|
|4.26%
|-
|style="background-color:"|
|align=left|Valery Pavlov
|align=left|Patriots of Russia
|
|3.92%
|-
|style="background:"| 
|align=left|Dmitry Semenov
|align=left|People's Freedom Party
|
|3.52%
|-
|style="background:"| 
|align=left|Anton Trefilov
|align=left|Communists of Russia
|
|3.42%
|-
|style="background:"| 
|align=left|Dmitry Sorokin
|align=left|Civic Platform
|
|1.99%
|-
|style="background:"| 
|align=left|Anton Saprykin
|align=left|Yabloko
|
|1.45%
|-
| colspan="5" style="background-color:#E9E9E9;"|
|- style="font-weight:bold"
| colspan="3" style="text-align:left;" | Total
| 
| 100%
|-
| colspan="5" style="background-color:#E9E9E9;"|
|- style="font-weight:bold"
| colspan="4" |Source:
|
|}

2021

|-
! colspan=2 style="background-color:#E9E9E9;text-align:left;vertical-align:top;" |Candidate
! style="background-color:#E9E9E9;text-align:left;vertical-align:top;" |Party
! style="background-color:#E9E9E9;text-align:right;" |Votes
! style="background-color:#E9E9E9;text-align:right;" |%
|-
|style="background-color:"|
|align=left|Anatoly Aksakov (incumbent)
|align=left|A Just Russia — For Truth
|
|41.64%
|-
|style="background-color:"|
|align=left|Aleksandr Andreyev
|align=left|Communist Party
|
|20.01%
|-
|style="background-color: " |
|align=left|Leonid Pronin
|align=left|United Russia
|
|14.08%
|-
|style="background-color:"|
|align=left|Elza Kuzmina
|align=left|New People
|
|6.46%
|-
|style="background-color:"|
|align=left|Nikolay Stepanov
|align=left|Party of Pensioners
|
|6.08%
|-
|style="background-color:"|
|align=left|Vyacheslav Solovyev
|align=left|Liberal Democratic Party
|
|3.69%
|-
|style="background-color:"|
|align=left|Aleksandr Vorobyev
|align=left|The Greens
|
|2.03%
|-
|style="background-color:"|
|align=left|Eduard Romanov
|align=left|Rodina
|
|1.32%
|-
| colspan="5" style="background-color:#E9E9E9;"|
|- style="font-weight:bold"
| colspan="3" style="text-align:left;" | Total
| 
| 100%
|-
| colspan="5" style="background-color:#E9E9E9;"|
|- style="font-weight:bold"
| colspan="4" |Source:
|
|}

Notes

References

Russian legislative constituencies
Politics of Chuvashia